Diego Alfredo Inostroza Mellado (born April 25, 1992) is a Chilean footballer who last played for Malaysian team Kuala Lumpur FA as a forward.

Career
In December 2010 he officially debuted in a match against Audax Italiano, that finished in a victory for "La U" by 2–1.

Honours
Universidad de Chile
Primera División de Chile: 2011 Apertura, 2011 Clausura

References

External links

Living people
1992 births
Chilean footballers
Universidad de Chile footballers
Association football forwards
Footballers from Santiago